is a Japanese feminine given name.

Possible writings
Shiori can be written using different kanji characters and can mean:
栞, "bookmark / guide"
撓, "lithe"
詩織, "poem, weave"
汐里, ''tide, village''
The name can also be written in hiragana or katakana.

People with the name
Shiori Asahi (旭 志織, born 1978), Japanese wrestler
Shiori Hirata (born 1999), Japanese sports shooter
Shiori Ino (猪野 詩織), 21-year-old Japanese female university student who was murdered in October 1999
, Japanese journalist
Shiori Izawa (井澤 詩織), Japanese voice actress
, Japanese team handball player
, Japanese actress
, Japanese professional footballer 
, Japanese ice hockey player
Shiori Koseki (小関 しおり), Japanese Olympic softball player
Shioli Kutsuna (忽那 汐里, born 1992), Japanese actress
Shiori Mikami (三上 枝織), Japanese voice actress
, Japanese women's footballer
Shiori Murakoso (born 1996), Japanese professional footballer 
,  Japanese handball player
Shiori Niiyama (新山 詩織), Japanese singer and songwriter
Shiori Nishida (西田 汐里, born 2003), Japanese singer, idol
, Japanese badminton player
, Japanese model
Shiori Sekine (関根 史織), Japanese musician, vocalist, and the only female member of Base Ball Bear
, Japanese professional footballer
Shiori Tamai (玉井 詩織), Japanese singer, idol
, Japanese politician
, Japanese ice hockey player

Fictional characters
 Shiori, from the anime series InuYasha
 Shiori Akino, from the anime and manga series Death Note
 Shiori Asagiri, from the anime series Tamako Market
 Shiori Fujisaki, the protagonist of the video game Tokimeki Memorial
 Shiori Ichinose, from the anime series Special 7: Special Crime Investigation Unit
 Shiori Kazami, from the anime Bakugan Battle Brawlers
 Shiori Kitano, from the 2003 film Battle Royale II: Requiem
 Shiori Minamino (remarried as Shiori Hatanaka), from the YuYu Hakusho series
 Shiori Misaka, from the anime and visual novel Kanon
 Shiori Nakamura (中村 しおり), from the Yo-kai Watch franchise
 Shiori Porter, from the web serial Heretical Edge
 Shiori Sakita, from the drama Maō
 Shiori Shiomiya, from the anime and manga series Kami nomi zo Shiru Sekai
 Shiori Takatsuki, a character from the anime series Revolutionary Girl Utena
 Shiori Tsukishima, from the anime and manga series Midori Days
 Shiori Tsuzuki, from the anime series Witchblade
Shiori Yumeoji, a character in the Revue Starlight franchise

Japanese feminine given names